Rathna is a 1998 Tamil language film directed by Ilanchezhiyan. The film stars Murali in a dualrole, while Sangita, Revathi and Maheswari play other supporting roles.

Cast

Soundtrack

Release
The film received negative reviews upon release, with a critic from Indolink.com noting it was a "film to be avoided" and that "Murali should choose roles better". Another critic wrote "it would've taken a really strong climax to rescue such a weak movie. But the ridiculous climax here is the perfect pinnacle to the sloppiness of the rest of the movie."

References

1998 films
1990s Tamil-language films
Indian action drama films
Twins in Indian films
Indian films about revenge
1998 directorial debut films
1990s action drama films